Brandon George Dickinson (born July 18, 1994), better known by his stage name Lil Bibby, is an American rapper and record executive. Beginning his career in 2011, Bibby released his debut mixtape in 2013, titled Free Crack. After signing with Kemosabe Records, he followed up the project with Free Crack 2 (2014) and Free Crack 3 (2015). In 2017, he eventually switched focus onto his own record label, Grade A Productions. Bibby would eventually sign fellow Chicago rapper and singer Juice Wrld and Australian rapper and singer the Kid Laroi to the label; both signed artists achieved success globally.

Career

2011–2013: Career beginnings and debut mixtape 
In 2013, Lil Bibby released his official mixtape, titled Free Crack. He cited Drake and Jadakiss, as two of his favorite rappers. Vice stated that Bibby's first mixtape were cleared from its influences from both of these rappers. The mixtape features guest appearances from these newcomers Lil Herb and King L, while the production was handled by Hit-Boy, Young Chop and The Olympicks, among others. DJ Scream hosted this mixtape. The tape combines his distinctive gruff and imposing voice, along with a solid delivery and flow. The music videos were released for tracks such as "How We Move" featuring King L, "Change", "Water" and "Tired of Talkin'".

2013–2015: 2014's Freshman Class, Free Crack 2 and Free Crack 3 
In December 2013, in an interview with XXL, Bibby hinted that the next step for his career could be an EP. In 2014, it was also stated, that the rapper Drake was a huge fan of Bibby and that they'd spoken in 2013, before the release of Bibby's debut mixtape. Bibby said it pushed him onto improve his debut release, adding the tracks "Water" and "Whole Crew".

In January 2014, Bibby appeared on Sway's radio show Sway in the Morning. On the show he spoke about the success of his debut mixtape, and also dropped a live freestyle. During the same month, Bibby also featured on New York's radio station, Hot 97. During the same month, Bibby stated in his interview with Billboard, that he was working on material for an EP, but was waiting on a couple of features. Bibby also appeared on the list of 2014's XXL Freshman Class. He was the last person selected to the list, due to Young Thug's last minute cancellation.

In July 2014, he made his appearance on the songs, collaborating with a fellow rapper and a Memphis-native Juicy J, and was featured on the remix to "Main Chick" performed by Kid Ink. After a few delays, Bibby's sophomore mixtape, Free Crack 2, was released on August 29, 2014. Free Crack 2, which was hosted by DJ Drama, includes guest appearances from Lil Herb, Wiz Khalifa, Juicy J, Kevin Gates, Jadakiss and Anthony Hamilton, among others. The mixtape has production from Juicy J, Honorable C.N.O.T.E., Sonny Digital and DJ Pain 1, among others. The mixtape was released for free digital download and rapidly accumulated over 120,000 downloads.

Free Crack 2 was received with critical acclaim. XXL magazine awarded the mixtape an XL, praising the mixtape's authenticity, catchy hooks and production, while also commenting that the mixtape showcases Bibby's "growth as an artist." RedEye awarded the mixtape three stars out of four, commenting on the tape's maturity and versatility and praising the ability of the song 'Dead or in Prison' to let Bibby's "emotion and natural charisma do the heavy lifting." BET gave the mixtape a positive review, awarding it five stars while commenting on its "new level of depth and introspection, detailing the difficult balance of fame and authenticity and how that effects everyday life in some of America's urban war zones."

2015–2016: FC3 the Epilogue & Free Crack 4 
In 2015, Bibby released two singles "Ridah" and "Aww Man" for an upcoming album, supposedly the fourth installment in his Free Crack series.  In late 2016, Bibby released "Thought It Was A Drought" and this was produced by DJ L Beats and Roberto Mario.  After a long period with no music, in early 2018, Bibby began using the hashtag "Free Bibby" on social media, protesting his label's refusal to allow him to release the project.

2017–present: Grade A Productions, Juice WRLD, and The Kid LAROI 

Bibby and his brother G-Money decided to launch their own record label known as Grade A Productions. In an interview with XXL, Bibby discussed his transition from being a rapper to starting a record label: 

In 2017, they discovered then upcoming American rapper Juice WRLD after hearing his song "Lucid Dreams". Under the label, Juice WRLD released his debut studio album Goodbye and Good Riddance on May 23, 2018, which was followed by 3 singles "All Girls Are The Same", "Lucid Dreams", and "Lean Wit Me". On March 8, 2019, he released his second studio album Death Race for Love which was followed by 2 singles "Robbery", and "Hear Me Calling". On December 8, 2019, Juice suffered from an overdose at an airport in Chicago which lead to his unexpected passing. On January 22, 2020, Grade A announced that posthumous projects from Juice will be released to honor his legacy. His first posthumous album Legends Never Die was released on July 10, 2020, which was followed by 3 singles "Righteous", "Tell Me U Luv Me" featuring Trippie Redd, and "Life's A Mess" featuring Halsey. Most recently his Second Post-Humous album Fighting Demons released December 10, 2021. Throughout 2020, other posthumous releases included "Smile" with The Weeknd, "Real Shit" with Benny Blanco, "Reminds Me Of You" by The Kid LAROI featuring Juice WRLD in 2020, and recently "Bad Boy" with Young Thug in 2021.

In 2019, Bibby later discovered upcoming Australian rapper and singer The Kid LAROI after hearing his song "Blessings" from his debut EP 14 With A Dream. In March, Bibby signed Laroi to Grade A. Under the label, Laroi released his debut mixtape F*CK LOVE on July 24 which was followed by 2 singles "GO" featuring Juice WRLD, which was a posthumous verse due to his sudden death in December 2019, and "TELL ME WHY". On November 6, Laroi released a deluxe edition of F*ck Love titled F*ck Love (SAVAGE) which was followed by 1 single "SO DONE".

Grade A Productions 

Grade A Productions is a record label founded by Lil Bibby in 2017.

Roster

Discography

Discography

Extended plays

Mixtapes

Singles

As lead artist

As featured artist

Guest appearances

References

External links 
 Lil Bibby Mixtapes

1994 births
Living people
African-American male rappers
Almighty Black P. Stone Nation
Rappers from Chicago
Midwest hip hop musicians
Drill musicians
Trap musicians
Gangsta rappers
21st-century American rappers
RCA Records artists
21st-century American male musicians